Tatjana Turanskyj (Hanover, 27 July 1966 - 18 September 2021)) was a German film director, producer, screenwriter and performer with feminist views.

Films 
 2001: Hangover (with Hangover Ltd.), 72 min.
 2003: Petra (with Hangover Ltd.), 70 min.
 2004: Wedding (together with Wiebke Berndt), 5 min.
 2005: Remake (with Hangover Ltd.), 20 min.
 2006: Sehnsucht nach Schüssen, 60 min.
 2007: Korleput (with Hangover Ltd.), 72 min., with Bastian Trost and Christine Groß
 2008: I’m a Dancer, 6 min.
 2010: Eine flexible Frau, 97 min., part 1 of a trilogy, with Mira Partecke, Laura Tonke, Bastian Trost
 2014: Top Girl oder La déformation professionnelle, 94 min., with Julia Hummer, Susanne Bredehöft, Jojo Pohl, Nina Kronjäger, RP Kahl
 2015: Orientierungslosigkeit ist kein Verbrechen, directed together with Marita Neher, 76 min., with Nina Kronjäger, Anna Schmidt, Kathrin Krottenthaler

References

External links 
 
 turanskyj & ahlrichs

1966 births
2021 deaths
People from Hanover
German feminists
German film directors
German film producers
German screenwriters
German performance artists